Khuzdul is a fictional language created by J. R. R. Tolkien, one of the languages of Middle-earth, specifically the secret and private language of the Dwarves.

External history 

Tolkien began developing Khuzdul before the publication in 1936 of The Hobbit, with some names appearing in the early versions of The Silmarillion. Tolkien based Khuzdul on Semitic languages, primarily Hebrew, featuring triconsonantal roots and similarities to Hebrew's phonology and morphology.
Tolkien noted some similarities between Dwarves and Jews: both were "at once natives and aliens in their habitations, speaking the languages of the country, but with an accent due to their own private tongue…".
Tolkien also commented of the Dwarves that "their words are Semitic obviously, constructed to be Semitic."

Although a very limited vocabulary is known, Tolkien mentioned he had developed the language to a certain extent. A small amount of material on Khuzdul phonology and root modifications has survived which is yet to be published.

Internal history
In the fictional setting of Middle-earth, little is known of Khuzdul (once written Khuzdûl), the Dwarves kept it secret, except for place names and a few phrases such as their battle-cry and Balin's tomb inscription in Moria, which read respectively:

The highest level of secrecy applied to Dwarves' "inner-names", their personal names, with the possible exception of the Petty-dwarves. The names of all Dwarves are "outer-names" either from another language (Dalish) or nicknames/titles, sometimes in Khuzdul: e.g. , .

According to the Lhammas, Khuzdul is a language isolate, the sole member of the Aulëan language family, not related to the Oromëan languages spoken by Elves. Aulëan was named from the Dwarvish tradition that it had been devised by Aulë the Smith, the Vala who created the Dwarves. Later, Tolkien dropped the origins of Elvish being taught by Oromë, but kept the origins of Khuzdul the same. It is said in The Silmarillion that Aulë created the dwarves, and taught them "the language he had devised for them", making Khuzdul both in fiction and reality, a constructed language.

The Dwarves had a great reverence for Aulë. Because of this, Khuzdul remained unchanged. As a result, all Dwarven clans could speak with each other without difficulty despite the great distances that separated them and the more than 12,000-year history of the language. Khuzdul was to the dwarves “a tongue of lore rather than a cradle-speech”, and was carefully learned through reverent study as they matured, to make sure Khuzdul was passed down unaltered from one generation to the next. The changeability of Khuzdul versus other languages was compared to "the weathering of hard rock and the melting of snow".

Dwarves were unwilling to teach outsiders Khuzdul, even to their non-dwarf friends. Dwarves would speak the languages of the region "but with an accent due to their own private tongue...", and being careful not to even speak Khuzdul around non-dwarves. Only a few non-Dwarves are recorded as having learnt Khuzdul, most notably the Elves Eöl, Fëanor's son Curufin, and reluctantly the Noldor loremasters of the Second Age:
"They understood and respected the disinterested desire for knowledge, and some of the later Ñoldorin loremasters were allowed to learn enough of both their "" (tongue) and their "" (gesture-code) to understand their systems."

There were many similarities between Khuzdul and the native tongues of Men of the Far-East of Middle-earth. This is because in the early days of Middle-earth, Men of these regions had friendly contact with the Dwarves, who "were not unwilling to teach their own tongue to Men with whom they had special friendship, but Men found it difficult and were slow to learn more than isolated words, many of which they adapted and took into their own language". Adûnaic, the language of Númenor, retained some Khuzdul influences and was said to have been influenced by Khuzdul's basic structure.

Iglishmêk
Besides their aglâb, spoken tongue, the Dwarves used a sign language, or iglishmêk, which was also just as secretive as Khuzdul. According to The War of the Jewels, it was learned simultaneously with the aglâb from childhood. The Dwarvish sign language was much more varied between communities than Khuzdul, which remained "astonishingly uniform and unchanged both in time and in locality".

Tolkien described of their structure and use among the dwarves:
"The component sign-elements of any such code were often so slight and so swift that they could hardly be detected, still less interpreted by uninitiated onlookers. As the Eldar eventually discovered in their dealings with the Naugrim, they could speak with their voices but at the same time by ‘gesture’ convey to their own folk modifications of what was being said. Or they could stand silent considering some proposition, and yet confer among themselves meanwhile."

Tolkien only gave a few examples of the Iglishmêk sign language in his unpublished notes. The command to "Listen!" involved a slight raising of both forefingers simultaneously. The acknowledgment "I am listening" involved a slight raising of the right-hand forefinger, followed by a similar raising of the left-hand forefinger.

Phonology

The following phonemes are attested in Tolkien's Khuzdul vocabulary.
{| class="wikitable" style="text-align: center; margin-left: auto; margin-right: auto; border: none;"
!  
! Labial
! Alveolar
! Postalveolar
! Palatal
! Velar
! Uvular
! Glottal
|-
! Plosive
| 
|  
|
|
|  
|
| 1
|-
! Aspirated Plosive
|
| 
|
|
| 2
|
|
|-
! Fricative
| 
|  
| 
|
|2
|
| 
|-
! Nasal
| 
| 
|
|
|
|
|
|-
! Trill
|
|  3
|
|
|
|  3
|
|-
! Approximant
|
| 
|
| 
|
|
|
|}

{| class="wikitable" style="text-align: center; margin-left: auto; margin-right: auto; border: none;"
|-
!
!Front
!Central
!Back
|-
! Close
|| || || 
|-
! Close-mid
|| ||4|| 
|-
! Open-mid
|| || ||4
|-
! Open
|| || || 
|}

Only one diphthong is attested in Khuzdul: ai [], as seen in ai-mênu.

1 Often at the start of words that begin with a vowel, often not written in the Latin alphabet, but has its own rune in Angerthas Moria.
2 Supposedly in Azaghâl, 'gh' [] is used to represent this sound in Black Speech and Orcish, but wasn't said of Khuzdul. Could also be [] or [].
3 Alveolar trill [] a later variant in pronunciation, the uvular trill [] being the original Khuzdul pronunciation.
4 No examples found, Tolkien explicitly states these were frequent in Khuzdul, and have their own Cirth runes. Possibly in between incompatible consonant formations or current vowels in known corpus.

Khuzdul features a CV(C(C)) syllable structure. Words that begin with either a vowel or diphthong have a glottal stop at the beginning to fill the place of an initial consonant. Words can not start with a consonant cluster, but these are found in medial or final positions in a word. It is unknown what all the consonant clusters are. Few are attested as shown in the corpus above, but presumably are more flexible and varied than of the consonant clusters found in the Elvish languages, as the language was said to be "cumbrous and unlovely" (Silmarillion ch. 10) to the elves, with Tolkien describing it as having a cacophonous quality.

Writing

Tolkien wrote most of Khuzdul in the Latin alphabet, and in Cirth within Middle-earth. The dwarves had adopted the Cirth from the elves by the end of the first age, and made changes to their liking to represent the sounds of Khuzdul. There were two methods known of writing Khuzdul, Angerthas Moria when the dwarves still lived in Khazad-dûm before its fall, and Angerthas Erebor once they fled and further developed the Cirth when they settled at Erebor, The Lonely Mountain.

The following table presents both Cirth mode readings:

As an example, the dwarvish battle-cry can be written thus:

Grammar

Too little is known of Khuzdul grammar to even construct a sentence, but the language was known to have its morphology based mainly on Hebrew, and other Semitic languages. Tolkien states that Khuzdul was complicated and unlike the other languages of Middle-earth at the time in terms of phonology and grammar. It has been said the grammar of Khuzdul influenced the basic grammar of Adûnaic, but little material is given to show these influences other than the mention of where Adûnaic's grammar differs from Quenya. Even then, differences could be influenced by other languages than Khuzdul.

Nouns and adjectives

Nouns and adjectives are known to have singular and plural forms and, like the Semitic languages, can be in the absolute or construct state. The construct state indicates a connection with the following noun, being a quality, belonging or part of that noun. The construct comes before the absolute noun e.g.: Baruk Khazâd! 'Axes + Dwarves' "Axes of the Dwarves" the axes belong to the dwarves, Khazad-dûm 'Dwarves + Delving' "Dwarrowdelf", a Dwarvish delving. The construct is also used for compounding words, in which it is the composition state, which may nor not be different to the construct form based on conjugation. There are no known (if any) definite or indefinite articles in Khuzdul.

Khuzdul appears to have case endings similar to Arabic, having nominative, accusative/genitive cases, and an adjectival suffix akin to the nisba in Arabic.

Nouns and adjectives appear to share different declensions for formation and number. How many declensions there might be in Khuzdul is currently unknown. Tolkien stated plural formations were said to be similar to Arabic's broken plurals, which would make for many irregular plurals; two examples are known: baruk, the plural of bark "axe", and Khazâd, the plural of Khuzdul.

Note that only Khuzd "Dwarf" and Rukhs "Orc" are the only nouns fully attested in this table. As the other roots are based on the attested forms of "Dwarf" and "Orc", they could differ from declension and/or broken plural patterns.

Other noun declension types likely exist, but little detail is provided to show any full declensions or identify any broken plurals. Of these, the only hints that point to their existence is in compounded attested words and single words:

The word baruk is both the absolute and construct plural form of bark, likely the result of being a broken plural.

Some patterns can be seen that hint at some details of what state and/or number a noun is in:
A CVCVC pattern with matching vowels, are common for construct patterns:
Singular: Baraz, Kheled, Zigil.
Plural: Sigin.
A VCCVC pattern, seen in ‘iCCaC and ‘uCCaC for a common singular pattern:
Absolute: ‘inbar
Construct: ‘uzbad
Vowel orders of "i-a" and "u-a" seem to apply for absolute and construct nouns respectively:
Absolute: Zirak, ‘inbar
Construct: Duban, ‘uzbad.
Long vowels seem to appear only in the absolute state:
Singular: Nâla’, Zâram, Narâg, Dûm/Tûm.
Plural: Khazâd, Tarâg, Shathûr, ‘ishmêk.

Another possible declension based from Nâla’ and Nulukkhizdîn, construct likely singular, but uncertain:

1 Possible assimilation of (’kh) → (kkh): Nulu’khizdîn → Nulukkhizdîn

Another noun form that may exist is the collective numbers, along with the singulative form. This is from observation of the names Buzundush and Tumunzahar, with roots of √BZ(Z) and √TM(M) / √DM(M) and the suffixes of "-n-, ân-, -în-, -ûn-" meaning a person / place; as seen in Gabilân, Nargûn, Nulukkhizdîn, Tharkûn are applied. Thus making a singular instance of what makes the collective, e.g. a single hall, out of a group of halls. Although being "absolute" in state within names, it's shortened to "-un-" as in the composition form, due to long vowels possibly being shortened before a consonant cluster.

1 Possible assimilation of (dt) → (dd): Khazad-tûm → Khazad-dûm.

Most compounded words feature an Adjective-Noun pattern, with Noun-Adjective pattern observed. This could hint at a flexible pattern, allowing both forms of Adjective-Noun and Noun-Adjective patterns. This could be done to stress the first element or for artistic purposes. Also to note is the role of verbal noun in a compound name, followed by a noun that the verbal noun applies to.

Verbs
Only four verb words are known. The exact tense or use of these verbs are unknown:
Felak : To use a tool like a broad-bladed chisel, or small axe-head without haft.
Felek: hew rock.
Gunud : delve underground, excavate, tunnel.
√S-L-N, Sulûn, Salôn : "fall, descend swiftly" (VT48:24).

Lexicon

Placenames & Names

Words

1 Seen in Tumunzahar in 'Hollowbold', with 'bold' as an obsolete term for dwelling. Assimilates to 'D' when precedes one, e.g. d-t = d-d : Khazad-dûm

Consonantal Roots

References

Further reading

External links
Magnus Åberg - An analysis of Dwarvish
Helge Fauskanger's Ardalambion site; discussion of Khuzdul
Eldamo: Khuzdul Compilation
Khuzdul Documents & Dictionaries - Neo-Khuzdul, based on Tolkien's attested Khuzdul.
A suggested expansion of Khuzdul into a fully functional language
 Fan made compilation of useful Tolkien terms

Middle-earth languages
 
Constructed languages
Constructed languages introduced in the 1930s